Main River, more commonly simply main, is a river in Germany.

Main River, may also refer to:
Main River (Chukotka), a river in far Eastern Siberia.
Main River (Newfoundland), a river in Newfoundland, Canada.
River Main (County Antrim), a river in Northern Ireland.

Legislative
Main river, a statutory designation of larger watercourses in England and Wales.

See also 
Lower Main River, New Brunswick, an unincorporated community in Weldford Parish, New Brunswick, Canada.
Maine River (disambiguation).
Main (disambiguation).